Flight 775 may refer to the following incidents involving commercial airliners:
 BOAC Flight 775, which was part of the Dawson's Field hijackings on 6 September 1970
Iran Aseman Airlines Flight 775, a non-fatal runway-miss that occurred on 18 July 2000
Uganda Airlines Flight 775, which crashed while attempting to land at Rome, Italy on 17 October 1988

0775